The 2014 Cheltenham Borough Council election took place on 22 May 2014 to elect members of Cheltenham Borough Council in England. This was on the same day as other local elections.

Election Result

Ward results

All Saints

Battledown

Benhall and The Reddings

Charlton Kings

Charlton Park

Note: the election in Charlton Park was delayed due to the death of a candidate. The election was held on 3 July 2014.

College

Hesters Way

Lansdown

Leckhampton

Note: Ian Bickerton was the sitting councillor. He was elected as a Liberal Democrat in 2010.

Oakley

Park

Pittville

Prestbury

Springbank

St Mark's

St Paul's

St Peter's

Swindon Village

Up Hatherley

Warden Hill

Note: the Conservatives had previously gained the Liberal Democrat seat in Warden Hill in a by-election. This election confirmed that by-election gain.

References

2014 English local elections
2014
2010s in Gloucestershire